Hypoatherina is a genus of silversides in the family Atherinidae.

Species
There are currently 13 recognized species in this genus:
 Hypoatherina barnesi L. P. Schultz, 1953 (Barnes' silverside)
 Hypoatherina celebesensis D. Sasaki & Kimura, 2012 
 Hypoatherina crenolepis (Schultz, 1953) (Crenulated silverside)
 Hypoatherina golanii D. Sasaki & Kimura, 2012 (Red Sea silverside) 
 Hypoatherina harringtonensis (Goode, 1877) (Reef silverside)
 Hypoatherina lunata D. Sasaki & Kimura, 2012 (Okinawan silverside) 
 Hypoatherina macrophthalma D. Sasaki & Kimura, 2012 
 Hypoatherina ovalaua (Herre, 1935) (Fijian silverside} 
 Hypoatherina temminckii (Bleeker, 1854) (Samoan silverside)
 Hypoatherina tropicalis (Whitley, 1948) (Whitley's silverside)
 Hypoatherina tsurugae (D. S. Jordan & Starks, 1901) (Cobalt silverside) 
 Hypoatherina uisila (D. S. Jordan & Seale, 1906) (Pacific silverside) 
 Hypoatherina valenciennei (Bleeker, 1854) (Sumatran silverside)

Fishbase has H. gobio as a synonym of H. temminckii and H. klunzingeri as a synonym of H. barnesi, while H. panatela is listed as Stenatherina panatela, other authorities include these species within Hypoatherina and place H. crenolepsis, H. harringtonensis, H. ovalua and H. valencennei in the genus Atherina.

References

Atherinomorinae
Taxa named by Leonard Peter Schultz
Ray-finned fish genera